Euphaedra fulvofasciata is a butterfly in the family Nymphalidae. It is found in Cameroon and the Democratic Republic of the Congo (Uele and Kivu).

References

Butterflies described in 1984
fulvofasciata